Andab-e Qadim (also Romanized as Andāb-e Qadīm) is a village in Qeshlaq Rural District, in the Central District of Ahar County, East Azerbaijan Province, Iran. At the 2006 census, its population was 282, in 65 families.

References 

Populated places in Ahar County